Grapevine yellow speckle viroid 1 is a type of viroid that infects grapevine.

References 

Viroids
Viral grape diseases